Brijesnica Mala (Cyrillic: Бријесница Мала) is a village in the municipality of Doboj East, Bosnia and Herzegovina.

Demographics 
According to the 2013 census, its population was 1,764.

References

Populated places in Doboj Istok